Fellows of the Royal Society elected in 1961.

Fellows

Sir James Baddiley
Harold Everard Monteagle Barlow
Maurice Stevenson Bartlett
Rupert Everett Billingham
Sir Clifford Charles Butler
Joseph Chatt
Brian Flowers, Baron Flowers
Louis Harold Gray
Sidney Henry Haughton
Rodney Hill
Howard Everest Hinton
Robert George Spencer Hudson
Frank Kearton, Baron Kearton
Heinz London
Montague Maizels
Irene Manton
Leo Edmond Marion
Arnold Ashley Miles
Douglas Geoffrey Northcott
George Joseph Popjak
Sir John Pople
Sir Rutherford Ness Robertson
Salimuzzaman Siddiqui
Sir Alec Skempton
Michael James Denham White

Foreign members

Olaf Holtedahl
Solomon Lefschetz
Elmer Verner McCollum
Aleksandr Nikolaevich Nesmeyanov

References

1961
1961 in science
1961 in the United Kingdom